Becca Conviser is a professional Opera Soprano. She has performed in venues all over Europe.

Biography 
Becca Conviser was a frequent attendee of the Lyric Opera of Chicago as a child. Her family moved to Glencoe, IL from Chicago, where she attended New Trier High School and began her vocal and instrumental training at the Music Institute of Chicago. As a student she performed in productions across the United States, including New York City and Boston.

She was the first American in history to reprise the role of Cizí kněžna in Dvorak’s Rusalka in the Czech Republic. In 2020, she was grant recipient from the Grammy's producer, The Recording Academy, and was deemed an essential artist by the Czech Ministry of Culture, allowing her to perform during the recent Czech National State of Emergency in response to the COVID-19 pandemic.

As a permanent international guest of the J. K. Tyl Theatre in Pilsen, Czech, she has performed in versions of Madame Butterfly, Rusalka, Die Braut von Messina, Nabucco, Carmen and Armida.

She is founder and director of the non-profit young artist program Opernfest Prague which provides education and training to young artists transitioning from conservatory to international careers.

Conviser holds a Bachelors and master's degree from the New England Conservatory where she was the recipient of the Perkins Opera Scholarship, and a Professional Studies Certificate from the Manhattan School of Music where she studied under Lorraine Nubar and Neil Rosenshein. In 2015 she was the winner of the St. Andrews International Aria Competition and as the grand prize winner of the The American Fine Arts Festival Competition, she performed at Carnegie Hall.

Selected performances

References

External links

 OperaBase

Living people
21st-century American opera singers
21st-century American women opera singers
American operatic sopranos
New England Conservatory alumni
Manhattan School of Music alumni
Singers from Chicago
Year of birth missing (living people)